Council President of the Turks of Caicos was the administrator of the Turks and Caicos from 1848 to 1874.

From 1492 to 1678 it was in possession by the Spanish (under the Viceroy of New Spain) and by French occupation from 1764–1783, but there was no formal government established by either colonial powers.

The islands was settled by BermudianBritish salt collectors in 1678, but they were not annexed until 1799. From 1799-1848 it was governed by the Governor of the Bahamas and 1873 to 1959 with local Council President (1848–1874) and by the Governor of Jamaica with local administration by Commissioners (1874–1959). A formal Governor was not added until 1959.

A list of Council of Presidents:

 Frederick Henry Alexander Forth 1848-1854
 William Robert Inglis (1823–1888) 1854-1862
 Alexander Wilson Moir 1862-1869
 Alexander Augustus Melfort Campbell 1869-1873

References
 Turks and Caicos Islands

 
Council Presidents